The Statute Law (Repeals) Act 1993 (c 50) is an Act of the Parliament of the United Kingdom.

It implemented recommendations contained in the fourteenth report on statute law revision, by the Law Commission and the Scottish Law Commission.

It repealed the whole of 159 Acts or Orders and portions of 462 others, passed from and after the year 1503.

Section 1 - Repeals and associated provisions
See section 6(1) of the Flood Prevention and Land Drainage (Scotland) Act 1997.

Section 4 - Short title and commencement
The majority of the act commenced upon royal assent.

The power conferred by section 4(3) (in relation to the Shipbuilding (Redundancy Payments) Act 1978 and the Shipbuilding Act 1985) was fully exercised by article 2 of the Statute Law (Repeals) Act 1993 (Commencement) Order 1996 (SI 1996/509) (C 9)

See also
Statute Law (Repeals) Act

References
Halsbury's Statutes. Fourth Edition. 2008 Reissue. Volume 41. Page 936.

External links
The Statute Law (Repeals) Act 1993, as amended, from the National Archives.
The Statute Law (Repeals) Act 1993, as originally enacted, from the National Archives.

United Kingdom Acts of Parliament 1993